Dame un Beso is a song by boy band Menudo. The song was released in 1982, sung by Johnny Lozada as the lead singer, as part of the group's Una Aventura Llamada Menudo film and its soundtrack.

References

1982 songs
Menudo (band) songs